Looking Glass is Fay Hield's first solo album.

Track listing

Personnel
Fay Hield (vocals)
Jon Boden (percussion, fiddle, guitar, concertina)
Sam Sweeney (fiddle, viola, nyckelharpa).
Jess Arrowsmith (vocals)
Keith Angel (percussion)
Hannah James (clogging)

Fay Hield albums
2010 debut albums